The Califon School District is a community public school district that serves students in pre-kindergarten through eighth grade from Califon, in Hunterdon County, New Jersey, United States.

As of the 2020–21 school year, the district, comprised of one school, had an enrollment of 91 students and 15.9 classroom teachers (on an FTE basis), for a student–teacher ratio of 5.7:1. In the 2016-17 school year, Califon had the seventh-smallest enrollment of any school district in the state.

The district is classified by the New Jersey Department of Education as being in District Factor Group "I", the second-highest of eight groupings. District Factor Groups organize districts statewide to allow comparison by common socioeconomic characteristics of the local districts. From lowest socioeconomic status to highest, the categories are A, B, CD, DE, FG, GH, I and J.

Public school students in ninth through twelfth grades attend Voorhees High School, which also serves students from Glen Gardner, Hampton, High Bridge, Lebanon Township and Tewksbury Township. As of the 2020–21 school year, the high school had an enrollment of 991 students and 76.4 classroom teachers (on an FTE basis), for a student–teacher ratio of 13.0:1. The school is part of the North Hunterdon-Voorhees Regional High School District, which also includes students from Bethlehem Township, Clinton Town, Clinton Township, Franklin Township, Lebanon Borough and Union Township who attend North Hunterdon High School in Annandale.

School
Califon Public School serves students in grades PreK-8. The school had an enrollment of 90 students for the 2020–21 school year.
Daniel Patton, Principal

Administration
Core members of the district's administration are:
Michele Cone, Superintendent
Cheryl Zarra, Business Administrator / Board Secretary

Board of education
The district's board of education is comprised of five members who set policy and oversee the fiscal and educational operation of the district through its administration. As a Type II school district, the board's trustees are elected directly by voters to serve three-year terms of office on a staggered basis, with either one or two seats up for election each year held (since 2012) as part of the November general election. The board appoints a superintendent to oversee the district's day-to-day operations and a business administrator to supervise the business functions of the district.

References

External links
Califon School District website
 
School Data for the Califon School District, National Center for Education Statistics
North Hunterdon-Voorhees Regional High School District

Califon, New Jersey
New Jersey District Factor Group I
School districts in Hunterdon County, New Jersey
Public K–8 schools in New Jersey